Olga Sergeyevna Stepanova (born 10 November 1986) is a Russian sport shooter.

She participated at the 2018 ISSF World Shooting Championships, winning a medal.

References

External links

Living people
1986 births
Russian female sport shooters
Running target shooters
Place of birth missing (living people)
21st-century Russian women